Ann Larsson is a Swedish ski-orienteering competitor. She won a bronze medal in the classic distance at the 1980 World Ski Orienteering Championships in Avesta, where she also won a silver medal in the relay. At the 1984 World Championships in Lavarone she again won a bronze medal in the classic distance, and a gold medal in the relay, together with Marie Gustafsson and Lena Isaksson.

References

Swedish orienteers
Female orienteers
Ski-orienteers
Year of birth missing (living people)
Living people